Christopher Franklin Lofton (born March 27, 1985) is an American professional basketball player for Seoul SK Knights of the Korean Basketball League. He played college basketball with the University of Tennessee Volunteers.

High school
Chris Lofton is from Maysville, Kentucky,  where he led the Mason County Royals (his high school basketball team) to a victory in the 2003 State Championships and led the Royals back to the state championship game the next year. Despite being named Mr. Basketball his senior year, Lofton was not recruited by Louisville or Kentucky.  He was recruited by University of Tennessee coach Buzz Peterson and subsequently chose to play for the Vols.

College
As a freshman, Lofton made third team All-America at Tennessee. Against the University of Georgia on February 11, 2006, he made a school record 9 three-point shots en route to a career-high 33 points in an 83–78 win. On December 23, 2006, he scored a new career-high 35 points in a 111–105 overtime victory against the University of Texas. For the 2005–2006 season, Lofton was selected as a second team All-America.

In the 2006–07 season, Lofton led the conference in scoring, with 20.8 points per game, and was named the SEC Player of the Year by the Associated Press. He led the Tennessee Volunteers to the Sweet 16 in the 2007 NCAA basketball tournament.
He was again named Second-team All-American for the 2006–07 season. During the summer after the 06–07 season, Lofton went to Kobe Bryant camp and tried out for the Pan Am USA team.

Instead of declaring for the 2007 NBA draft, Lofton announced that he would return to Knoxville for his senior season.  Lofton was featured on the cover of the November 21, 2007 Sports Illustrated issue, holding a basketball away from Chris Douglas-Roberts of the University of Memphis. Sports Illustrated picked Tennessee 3rd in the country and Lofton as a 1st Team All-American.   On December 19, 2007, Lofton passed Allan Houston to become first on Tennessee's list for most three-point field goals made.  Houston had held the record with 346 three-pointers made.  On January 22, 2008, Lofton passed Pat Bradley of the University of Arkansas to capture the record for the most career three-pointers in the Southeastern Conference with 367. His final three-pointer came vs. Louisville in the Sweet 16 of the 2008 NCAA Tournament, a game which Tennessee lost 79–60. Lofton was also selected to Third Team All-America for his senior season.

Pro career
In July 2008, Lofton signed a one-year contract with Mersin Büyükşehir Belediyesi of the Turkish Basketball League. On February 8, 2009, he scored 47 
points (on 13/20 3-pointers) in a win against Fenerbahçe Ülker. On April 25, 2009, he scored 61 points (on 17/22 3-pointers) in a win against CASA TED Kolejliler.
In June 2009, it was announced that Lofton had been asked to play for the Boston Celtics summer league team. In the season 2009–10, Chris Lofton was signed by Spanish ACB League powerhouse, Caja Laboral Baskonia. After only a few games played, Lofton left Caja Laboral; he had previously been hospitalized with fever. Soon after, Lofton signed with another Spanish team CB Estudiantes. In November 2010, he was selected 6th overall by the Iowa Energy in the NBA D-League Draft. He has since chosen to return to Europe. In March 2011 he signed with Lokomotiv Kuban in Russia, but left the team in May 2011 by mutual agreement. In August 2011 he returned to CB Estudiantes, signing a one-year deal but finally he couldn't play with the team of Madrid until January 2012 because of his physical problems.

In August 2012, Lofton signed with Basque squad Lagun Aro GBC, but one month later left the team due to an injury in his left knee. On August 17, 2013, he signed a one-year deal with Beşiktaş. On July 18, 2014, he extended his contract with Beşiktaş for one more season. On February 22, 2017, Lofton signed with Neptūnas Klaipėda of the Lithuanian Basketball League.

On November 1, 2017, he signed with Le Mans Sarthe.

Now currently playing for the KBL (Korean Basketball League) with the Seoul SK Knights.

Cancer
Following the end of the 2007 season, Lofton was diagnosed with testicular cancer, which he kept a secret to all but Bruce Pearl, his parents, and a small number of university officials. Not until over halfway through the 2007–2008 season did Lofton even tell his roommate and teammate Jordan Howell, who was the only player to know. He was diagnosed after failing a random drug screen during the 2007 NCAA tournament. The failed test turned out to be the result of a tumor marker. Afterward, he underwent successful radiation treatments and surgery and is now considered cancer-free.

Awards and accomplishments
2007 SEC Player Of The Year

See also
List of NCAA Division I men's basketball career 3-point scoring leaders

Notes and references

External links
Euroleague.net Profile
FIBA.com Profile
TBLStat.net Profile
Tennessee Volunteers Profile
ESPN.com Profile
ACB Profile

1986 births
Living people
African-American basketball players
All-American college men's basketball players
American expatriate basketball people in France
American expatriate basketball people in Lithuania
American expatriate basketball people in Russia
American expatriate basketball people in South Korea
American expatriate basketball people in Spain
American expatriate basketball people in Turkey
American men's basketball players
Basketball players from Kentucky
Beşiktaş men's basketball players
CB Estudiantes players
Gipuzkoa Basket players
Iowa Energy players
Le Mans Sarthe Basket players
Liga ACB players
Mason County High School alumni
Mersin Büyükşehir Belediyesi S.K. players
BC Neptūnas players
PBC Lokomotiv-Kuban players
People from Maysville, Kentucky
Saski Baskonia players
Seoul SK Knights players
Shooting guards
Tennessee Volunteers basketball players
21st-century African-American sportspeople
20th-century African-American people